Luis Arata (1895–1967) was an Argentine stage and film actor.

Selected filmography
 Outside the Law (1937)

References

Bibliography 
 Finkielman, Jorge. The Film Industry in Argentina: An Illustrated Cultural History. McFarland, 24 Dec 2003.

External links 
 

1895 births
1967 deaths
Argentine male film actors
Argentine male stage actors
Male actors from Buenos Aires
20th-century Argentine male actors